Ebenezer Seeley (April 9, 1793-Jan. 23,1866) was an American lawyer and politician.

Seeley, the son of Ebenezer Seeley, was born in Wilton, Connecticut, April 9, 1793.

He graduated from Yale College in 1814.  He studied law under Seth Perkins Staples, Esq., of New Haven, Connecticut, and afterwards with Hon. Roger Minott Sherman, at Fairfield, Connecticut, where he commenced practice, but afterwards removed to Bridgeport, Connecticut. In 1825, he took up his residence in New Haven, and in 1832-3 was Mayor of New Haven. In 1834 he was elected to the Connecticut State Senate, from the 4th Senatorial District. In 1837, he removed to New York, where he continued the practice of his profession until his death, Jan. 23,1866.

Seeley sought professional rather than political distinction, and enjoyed a high legal reputation. He maintained also through life an unusual familiarity with the ancient classics. During the American Civil War, he was an earnest supporter of the Government, and gave most freely to the various charities which the war called into operation.

He was twice married ; first, to Elizabeth, daughter of John Titus, of Flushing, New York, who died during his residence at Bridgeport. His second wife was Alice, daughter of John I. Glover, of New York, who died in 1844. One of his two sons by the first marriage, John T. Seeley, J Esq., of New York, survived him.

1793 births
1866 deaths
People from Wilton, Connecticut
Yale College alumni
Connecticut lawyers
Mayors of New Haven, Connecticut
Connecticut state senators
19th-century American politicians
19th-century American lawyers